Yuan Huiqin (born 6 October 1965) is a Chinese Peking opera performer who specializes in old dan (female) roles. 
She is currently the vice-president of China National Peking Opera Company.

Repertoire (incomplete)

References

1965 births
Living people
Chinese Peking opera actresses
National Academy of Chinese Theatre Arts alumni
21st-century Chinese actresses
20th-century Chinese actresses
Chinese film actresses
Actresses from Hubei
Singers from Hubei
People from Yichang
Chinese television actresses
20th-century Chinese women singers
21st-century Chinese women singers